Konami Cross Media NY, Inc. (formerly 4Kids Productions) is an American production company owned by Konami. It was formerly a subsidiary of 4Kids Entertainment (which later became 4Licensing Corporation) and is responsible for producing English-language adaptations of Japanese anime series, primarily of the Yu-Gi-Oh! franchise. The company was shut down on June 30, 2012, due to continued lack of profitability, but the production office was acquired by Konami and renamed 4K Media later that year.

The company is primarily dedicated to the licensing, sales, and distribution of the Yu-Gi-Oh! brand in the United States. Since its acquisition, the office has produced localized versions of Yu-Gi-Oh! Zexal, Yu-Gi-Oh! Arc-V, and Yu-Gi-Oh! VRAINS. The company was granted the rights to manage the gaming properties, Bomberman, Contra and Frogger. Rounding out their IP portfolio is Rebecca Bonbon, the girl's anime brand created by Yuko Shimuzu.

On April 1, 2019, the company's name was changed to Konami Cross Media NY, reflecting its expansion to manage Konami brands outside of video games. In addition to the localization and license management of intellectual property (IP), Cross Media NY will produce and develop new businesses with Konami's IP. It is located in  53 W 23rd St 11th floor, New York, NY 10010.

Licensed products 
 Bomberman
 Contra
 Frogger Rebecca BonBon Yu-Gi-Oh! Products 
 Movies 
 Yu-Gi-Oh! The Dark Side of Dimensions (2017)

 Television 
 Yu-Gi-Oh! Zexal (2012–2015)
 Yu-Gi-Oh! Arc-V (2015–2018)
 Yu-Gi-Oh! VRAINS (2018–2021)
 Frogger (2021)
 Yu-Gi-Oh! Sevens (2022–present)
 Yu-Gi-Oh! Go Rush!! (TBA)

 Video games 

 Contra: Rogue Corps (2019)
 Yu-Gi-Oh! Rush Duel: Dawn of the Battle Royale!! (2021)
 Frogger (Intellivision Amico)''  (TBA)

See also 
 Konami
 List of 4Kids Entertainment licenses and productions

References 

Anime companies
Konami
Mass media companies based in New York City
American companies established in 1992
Mass media companies established in 1992
Dubbing (filmmaking)
2012 mergers and acquisitions
American subsidiaries of foreign companies